Azat Yagafarov (born 4 April 1961, Sarles, Aznakayevsky District) is a Russian political figure and a deputy of the  8th State Duma.
 
From 1985 to 1988, he worked as an economist and as deputy head of the planning and economic department of the oil and gas production department Aktyubaneft. From 1990 to 1992, he was the leading engineer at the Tatneft. From 1992 to 1999, he was the head of the representative office in Moscow of the Tatneft association. In 2004, he started working as a Deputy General Director of Tatneft. Since September 2021, he has served as deputy of the 8th State Duma from the Tatarstan constituency.

References
 

 

1961 births
Living people
United Russia politicians
21st-century Russian politicians
Eighth convocation members of the State Duma (Russian Federation)
People from Aznakayevsky District